The 2015 Nigerian Senate election in Nasarawa State was held on March 28, 2015, to elect members of the Nigerian Senate to represent Nasarawa State. Suleiman Adokwe representing Nasarawa South and Philip Aruwa representing Nasarawa North won on the platform of Peoples Democratic Party, while Abdullahi Adamu representing Nasarawa West won on the platform of All Progressives Congress.

Overview

Summary

Results

Nasarawa South 
Peoples Democratic Party candidate Suleiman Adokwe won the election, defeating All Progressives Congress candidate Salihu Hussain and other party candidates.

Nasarawa North 
Peoples Democratic Party candidate Philip Aruwa won the election, defeating All Progressives Congress candidate Idris Yahuza and other party candidates.

Nasarawa West 
All Progressives Congress candidate Abdullahi Adamu won the election, defeating Peoples Democratic Party candidate Aliyu Wadada and other party candidates.

References 

Nasarawa State Senate elections
March 2015 events in Nigeria
Nas